Candlemass is the eighth studio album by Swedish doom metal band Candlemass, released in 2005. This was the band's last album with singer Messiah Marcolin.

A video for the album's opener, "Black Dwarf", was made. The song "Witches" was also included in the soundtrack for the 2009 video game Brütal Legend.

Track listing

Personnel
Candlemass
 Messiah Marcolin - vocals
 Mats Björkman - rhythm guitar
 Lars Johansson - lead guitars
 Leif Edling - bass
 Jan Lindh - drums

Additional musicians
Carl Westholm – additional keyboards

Production
Pontus Norgren - producer, engineer, mixing
Uffe Larsson, Anders Ringman - vocal overdubs engineers at Platform Studios
Niklas Flyckt - mixing
Claes Persson - mastering

Charts

References

Candlemass (band) albums
2005 albums
Nuclear Blast albums